Batehaven is a locality approximately  from Batemans Bay in south-central New South Wales.

Demographics
 Aboriginal and Torres Strait Islander people made up 5.8% of the population. 
 77.8% of people were born in Australia and 89.0% of people only spoke English at home. 
 The most common responses for religion were No Religion 26.1%, Catholic 26.0% and Anglican 24.3%.

References

Towns in the South Coast (New South Wales)
Eurobodalla Shire
Coastal towns in New South Wales